Pohari Assembly constituency (formerly, Pohri) is one of the 230 Vidhan Sabha (Legislative Assembly) constituencies of Madhya Pradesh state in central India. This constituency came into existence in 1951, as Sheopur Pohri, one of the 79 Vidhan Sabha constituencies of the erstwhile Madhya Bharat state.

Overview
Pohari (constituency number 24) is one of the 5 Vidhan Sabha constituencies located in Shivpuri district. This constituency covers the entire Pohari tehsil and parts of Shivpuri and Narwar tehsils of the district.

Pohari is part of Gwalior Lok Sabha constituency along with seven other Vidhan Sabha segments, namely, Karera in this district and Gwalior Rural, Gwalior, Gwalior East, Gwalior South, Bhitarwar and Dabra in Gwalior district.

Members of Legislative Assembly
As Sheopur Pohri constituency of Madhya Bharat:
 1951: Malkhan Singh Rawat, Indian National Congress / Udaybhan Singh, Indian National Congress
As a constituency of Madhya Pradesh:
 2008: Prahlad Bharti, Bharatiya Janata Party
 2013: Prahlad Bharti, Bharatiya Janata Party
2018: Suresh Rathkedha (Dhakad), Indian National Congress
2020 (By election): Suresh Rathkedha (Dhakad), Bharatiya Janata Party

See also
 Shivpuri district

References

Shivpuri district
Assembly constituencies of Madhya Pradesh